Perama may refer to:

Perama, a city near Athens, Greece
Perama, Ioannina, a municipal unit in the Ioannina regional unit, Greece
Perama, Rethymno, a village in the Rethymno regional unit, Greece, part of Geropotamos
Perama (plant), a plant genus from the madder family (Rubiaceae)